The Singapore Strait is a ,  strait between the Strait of Malacca in the west and the South China Sea in the east. Singapore is on the north of the channel, and the Indonesian Riau Islands are on the south. The two countries share a maritime border along the strait.

It includes Keppel Harbour and many small islands. The strait provides the deepwater passage to the Port of Singapore, which makes it very busy. Approximately 2,000 merchant ships traverse the waters on a daily basis in 2017. The depth of the Singapore Strait limits the maximum draft of vessels going through the Straits of Malacca, and the Malaccamax ship class.

Historical records

The 9th century AD Muslim author Ya'qubi referred a Bahr Salahit or Sea of Salahit (from the Malay selat meaning strait), one of the Seven Seas to be traversed to reach China. Some have interpreted Sea of Salahit as referring to Singapore, although others generally considered it the Malacca Strait, a point of contact between the Arabs and the Zābaj (likely Sumatra). Among early Europeans travellers to South East Asia, the Strait of Singapore may refer to the whole or the southern portion of the Strait of Malacca as well as other stretches of water. Historians also used the term in plural, "Singapore Straits", to refer to three or four different straits found in recorded in old texts and maps – the Old Strait of Singapore between Sentosa and Telok Blangah, the New Strait of Singapore southwest of Sentosa, the "Governor's Strait" or "Strait of John de Silva" which corresponds to Phillip Channel, and the Tebrau Strait. Today the Singapore Strait refers to the main channel of waterway south of Singapore where the international border between Singapore and Indonesia is located.

Extent
The International Hydrographic Organization defines the limits of the Singapore Strait as follows:
On the West. The Eastern limit of Malacca Strait [A line joining Tanjong Piai (Bulus), the Southern extremity of the Malay Peninsula and The Brothers and thence to Klein Karimoen].

On the East. A line joining Tanjong Datok, the Southeast point of Johore through Horsburgh Reef to Pulo Koka, the Northeastern extreme of Bintan Island.

On the North.
The Southern shore of Singapore Island, Johore Shoal and the Southeastern coast of the Malay Peninsula.

On the South. A line joining Klein Karimoen to Pulo Pemping Besar thence along the Northern coasts of Batam and Bintan Islands to Pulo Koka.

Pilot guides and charts
Pilot guides and charts of the Malacca and Singapore straits have been published for a considerable time due to the nature of the straits

Second World War
The strait was mined by the British during the Second World War.

Accidents
In 2009, the Maersk Kendal grounded on the Monggok Sebarok reef.

See also
 
 
 Bay of Bengal
 Andaman Sea
 Exclusive economic zone of Indonesia
 Exclusive economic zone of Malaysia

References

Further reading
Kwa, C.G., Heng, D., Borschberg, P. and Tan, T.Y., Seven Hundred Years: A History of Singapore (Singapore: Marshall Cavendish, 2019).
Kwa, C.G. and Borschberg, P., Studying Singapore before 1800 (Singapore: NUS Press, 2018).
Borschberg, Peter, “Three questions about maritime Singapore, 16th and 17th Centuries”, Ler História, 72 (2018): 31–54. https://journals.openedition.org/lerhistoria/3234
Borschberg, Peter and Khoo, J.Q. Benjamin, "Singapore as a Port City, c.1290–1819: Evidence, Frameworks and Challenges", Journal of the Malaysian Branch of the Royal Asiatic Society, 91.1 (2018): 1-27. https://www.academia.edu/35832776 
Borschberg, Peter, "Singapura in Early Modern Cartography: A Sea of Challenges", in Visualising Space. Maps of Singapore and the Region. Collections from the National Library and National Archives of Singapore (Singapore: NLB, 2015): 6-33. https://www.academia.edu/8681191
Borschberg, Peter, The Singapore and Melaka Straits. Violence, Security and Diplomacy in the 17th Century, Singapore and Leiden: NUS Press and KITLV Press, 2010. https://www.academia.edu/4302722 
Borschberg, Peter, Jacques de Coutre's Singapore and Johor, 1595-c1625, Singapore: NUS Press, 2015. https://www.academia.edu/9672124 
Borschberg, Peter, Admiral Matelieff's Singapore and Johor, 1606–1616, Singapore, 2015. https://www.academia.edu/11868450
Borschberg, Peter, "The Singapore Straits in the Latter Middle Ages and Early Modern Period (c.13th to 17th Centuries). Facts, Fancy and Historiographical Challenges", Journal of Asian History, 46.2 (2012): 193–224. https://www.academia.edu/4285020
Borschberg, Peter, "The Straits of Singapore: Continuity, Change and Confusion", in Sketching the Straits. A Compilation of the Lecture Series on the Charles Dyce Collection, ed. Irene Lim (Singapore: NUS Museums, 2004): 33–47. https://www.academia.edu/4311413
Borschberg, Peter, "Singapore and its Straits, 1500–1800", Indonesia and the Malay World 43, 3 (2017) https://www.tandfonline.com/doi/full/10.1080/13639811.2017.1340493
Borschberg, Peter, "Singapore in the Cycles of the Longue Duree", Journal of the Malaysian Branch of the Royal Asiatic Society, 90 (1) (2017), pp. 32–60. 
Gibson-Hill, Carl-Alexander, "Singapore: Note on the History of the Old Straits, 1580–1850", Journal of the Malayan Branch of the Royal Asiatic Society, 27.1 (1954): 165–214.

International straits
Straits of Indonesia
Straits of Singapore
Straits of the South China Sea
Indonesia–Singapore border
Maritime Southeast Asia
Shipping in Asia
Sea lanes
Landforms of the Riau Islands
Riau Archipelago
Strait of Malacca